The Divine Antithesis is the third studio album by De Magia Veterum, released on February 7, 2011 by Transcendental Creations.

Critical reception 

Eduardo Rivadavia of AllMusic calls the album "highly sophisticated" and "a ceaseless blur of aural overkill."

Track listing

Personnel
Adapted from The Divine Antithesis liner notes.
 Maurice de Jong (as Mories) – vocals, instruments, recording, cover art

Release history

References

External links 
 
 The Divine Antithesis at Bandcamp

2011 albums
De Magia Veterum albums